Tifluadom is a benzodiazepine derivative with an unusual activity profile. Unlike most benzodiazepines, tifluadom has no activity at the GABAA receptor, but instead is a selective agonist for the κ-opioid receptor. In accordance, it has potent analgesic and diuretic effects in animals, and also has sedative effects and stimulates appetite.

While tifluadom has several effects which might have potential uses in medicine, such as analgesia and appetite stimulation, κ-opioid agonists tend to produce undesirable effects in humans such as dysphoria and hallucinations, and so these drugs tend to only be used in scientific research. Dysphoric effects are similar to those seen when using other κ-opioid receptor agonists like pentazocine and salvinorin A, and can be considered the opposite of morphine-induced euphoria. As such, kappa agonists are believed to have very limited abuse potential.

See also
 Lufuradom
 GYKI-52895, a benzodiazepine which is a dopamine reuptake inhibitor without GABAergic function
 GYKI-52,466, a benzodiazepine which is an AMPAkine and glutamate antagonist without GABAergic function

References

Carboxamides
Benzodiazepines
Dissociative drugs
Kappa-opioid receptor agonists
Fluoroarenes
Thiophenes